Isaki Lacuesta (born 1975, Girona) is a Spanish film director from Catalonia. His work includes documentary film, narrative film and video art.

Lacuesta was born into a family of Basque origin. He studied audiovisual communication at the Autonomous University of Barcelona and obtained his Master's Degree in documentary film making at Pompeu Fabra University in Barcelona, where he now works as a lecturer in documentary film making. He also teaches at the Autonomous University of Barcelona, Pompeu Fabra University, the Centre d'estudis cinematogràfics de Catalunya, and the University of Girona.

He is a longtime collaborator and domestic partner of Isa Campo, after whom he rebranded his first name as Isaki (he is actually named Iñaki).

Prizes and awards 

 2011: Golden Shell for Best Film at the San Sebastián International Film Festival  for Los pasos dobles
 2011: Caracola a la trayectoria at the Alcances Festival in Cádiz
 2011: Eloy de la Iglesia Award at the Málaga Film Festival
 2011: Pantalla Hall Award for young film makers at the Ibn Arabi Festival in Murcia
 2009: Spanish FIPRESCI Prize at the Donostia-San Sebastián Festival
 2006: Spain film prize from the city of Donostia-San Sebastián

Filmography (selection) 

 Feature films
 2022: Un año, una noche (One Year, One Night)
 2018: Entre dos aguas
 2016: La propera pell (Next Skin)
 2015: Murieron por encima de sus posibilidades
 2011: Los pasos dobles
 2011: El cuaderno de barro
 2010: La noche que no acaba
 2009: Los condenados (The Damned)
 2006: La leyenda del tiempo
 2002: Cravan vs. Cravan

 Short films

 2009: In between days
 2004: Teoria dels cossos
 2000: Caras vs Caras

 Video installations

 2010: Mullada llum!
 2008 Los cuerpos traslúcidos
 2007: Traços/traces

References

External links 
 
http://www.latermitafilms.com/es/ (in Spanish)

1975 births
Living people
People from Girona
Film directors from Catalonia
Autonomous University of Barcelona alumni
Academic staff of the Autonomous University of Barcelona
Pompeu Fabra University alumni
Academic staff of Pompeu Fabra University
Academic staff of the University of Girona
21st-century Spanish screenwriters